

See also
 Florida
 List of municipalities in Florida
 List of counties in Florida

References

USGS Fips55 database

Lists of places in Florida
Places